Road signs in Ireland do not differ greatly from those used elsewhere in Europe, but there are some differences between those used in the Republic of Ireland and those used in Northern Ireland, including different systems of units used in each jurisdiction.

Republic of Ireland
Road signs in the Republic of Ireland do not differ greatly from those used elsewhere in Europe – with the notable exception that hazard or warning signs follow the "New World" style of a yellow diamond. The symbols used on these warning signs do, nevertheless, resemble much more closely those used (on red-bordered white or yellow triangles) in the rest of Europe than many of those seen in the United States.

Regulatory signs (relating to limits and prohibitions) differ very little from those used in the rest of Europe.

The system of directional signs is based upon, and is very similar to, that employed in the United Kingdom, but is bilingual everywhere except in the Gaeltacht, where only the Irish language is used on signs.

All distances (and other measurements) are expressed in metric units. On 20 January 2005, imperial speed limits on signs were replaced with metric speed limits. Around 35,000 existing signs were modified or replaced and a further 23,000 new signs were erected bearing the speed limit in kilometres per hour. To avoid confusion with the old signs, all speed limit signs include the mention "km/h" beneath the numerals.

Legal basis
Signs in the Republic of Ireland are prescribed under the Traffic Signs Manual (TSM), issued by the Department of Transport and published in 2019 (with some chapters updated in 2021). This succeeded two earlier editions - Traffic Signs Manual 2010 and Traffic Signs Manual 1996.

Older signs appear in secondary legislation (see the references section at the bottom), however many of the signs (particularly directional signs) used have never been legally prescribed; the TSM itself is not a law. However, signs are meant to be based on the principles in it. It is predominantly copied from (particularly directional signs) the United Kingdom Traffic Signs Manual, itself based on the Traffic Signs Regulations and General Directions (the TSRGD).

Those road signs which are prescribed in law are prescribed under the Road Traffic (Signs) Regulations 1997-2004, the 1997 regulations being the main set which repealed various traffic signs regulations dating back to 1964.

Directional signs

Typefaces and colours

 

Directional signs in the Republic of Ireland are fairly similar to the United Kingdom design. All Irish text is in italic print, in lower case lettering with initial letters in capitals. Irish script is inclined at 15 degrees to the vertical. The Irish text is placed above the corresponding English. All English text is in upper case Roman alphabet. The Transport Heavy and Motorway typefaces are used, although the Irish language text uses a distinctive oblique variant, in which letters a are represented by script a (ɑ), and letters i were represented by dotless  i (ı) in order to better differentiate them from their accented forms, however, the normal letter i is now used frequently. Additionally, the capitals M, N and A are similar in appearance to lowercase m, n and a. Only the Irish place name is shown if the sign is in the Gaeltacht, or the official name in English is identical to the Irish name or nearly so (for example Dún Laoghaire or Port Laoise). Due to the practice of signposting in both languages, usually a limited number of destinations will be signposted. If a destination can be reached by following a route which is a spur from that route, the destination and route number will be shown in brackets. Also, distances are shown in kilometres.

Motorway signs use white text on a blue background. Non-motorway national primary routes use white text on a green background, with the specific route number in yellow bold text. Regional and local county roads use black text on white background. Signs to points of interest (services, institutions, tourist sights) have white text on a brown background. Patching (according to the Guildford Rules) is used to show roads of different classification on signs. On all purpose roads, signs for roads whose only destination is a motorway should display the motorway symbol.

Types of sign available
A number of types of sign are available for use on all purpose roads. A properly signed junction will be signed in advance by advance directional signs, which can either be map type (which displays the junction as a pictogram) or stack type, in which the destinations are on separate panels. In the Republic of Ireland, National Roads Authority (NRA) policy encourages stack type signs at normal intersections (such as T-junctions or crossroads), with map-type signs used mainly for roundabouts and for grade-separated junctions. However map-type signs are occasionally used at normal intersections where it is necessary to sign a restriction (such as a weight or height restriction). At the junction itself, either a flag sign – a sign with a triangular point at one end and a chevron – or (on rural roads) a fingerpost points the driver in the direction to be taken. After the junction, a route confirmation sign listing the route number and the primary destinations will be erected.

However, on rural roads, it is common for some or all of the above signs to be missing. Often junctions are signed with only a fingerpost.

Destination signing policy
One feature of road signs in the Republic of Ireland, particularly along Dublin's quays, is that some national primary road signs direct drivers generically to destinations such as "The West" and "The South" and "The North". This system, inherited from the UK system, was banned under the 1996 TSM, which mandates the use of the terminal destination and next primary destination of the route instead, but signs were patched with specific destinations only in the early 2000s (decade). While this has been replaced with specific placenames in some cases, it remains in use in other areas. In summer 2006, signs for "North" and "South" were erected in Ashbourne at the start of the new N2 dual carriageway. Nevertheless, generally directional signs on major routes show major or end destinations. Smaller towns and placenames are shown only on signs nearer to that location.

Motorway / high quality dual carriageway signs

Original design
The original design (1983–1989) of Republic of Ireland motorway signs were a simpler version of the UK design. These signs were only ever in use on the M7 Naas Bypass and M1 Airport Motorway and only rare examples are still in situ.

From 1989–2005, signs on motorways were nearly identical to that on UK motorways (but see new motorway signs, below); although in the Republic of Ireland, motorway junctions were not always numbered, or the number was not always signposted. The sign at the actual exit, which in the UK shows the road number to be reached, was replaced by a flag sign with the destination instead. On the M50, in the case of junctions with national routes, the initial advance direction sign was replaced with a list of destinations for that national route. The 1989 design of signs can still be seen on older sections of the M4 and M7.

2005-2007
In 2005, upon the opening of the South Eastern Motorway section of the M50, the National Roads Authority erected new style gantry signs. The new signs retained typical colours and fonts but differed from older side of road signs in that they used separate overhead panels for each lane, headed with the route number in each case as well as new half-gantry signs closer to the exit. The new signs were also erected on the N2 Finglas–Ashbourne scheme and N7 Clondalkin–Naas scheme. These were the first roads in Ireland where overhead gantry signs have been used as a matter of course, instead of just very major junctions. Drivers are given clear advanced warning 1 km ahead of an upcoming junction. A half gantry at the junction then directed them to their destination. The new style signs are visually clearer than older type signs with drivers able to read the gantry signs from a distance of approximately 300 m on a straight stretch of road. Despite their significant advantages, the new gantry signs caused confusion because the downward arrows over the left traffic lanes seemed to indicate to drivers that they should pull out into the right lane if they wish to continue on the motorway or dual carriageway, breaking the keep left rule.

Current signing policy
In July 2007, some of the gantry signs on the M50 between Junctions 13–17 erected in 2005 were replaced with signs in a revised style, reverting to a single panel over the mainline. By March 2008 all the 2005 style gantries had been removed from the M50 (and were later removed from the N2 and N7). The one aspect of the 2005 scheme that was retained is the half-gantry (or cantilever) sign just before the exit, which has now also been extended to other roads. A second change introduced in 2007 is that the flag sign at the gore, which previously listed the primary destinations to be reached, now features the junction number and the word "Exit" instead. This revised scheme has been used on most motorway and high-quality dual carriageway schemes since 2007. The "Next Exit" signs listing destinations, which were originally used only on the M50, are now extended to other motorways.

Thus the sequence of signs at a motorway junction in Ireland on motorways opened since 2007 (and older motorways which have been re-signed) is as follows:

 "Next Exit" – sign at 2 km listing primary destinations to be reached by this exit
 1 km – advance directional sign (map type) or gantry in lieu
 500 m – advance directional sign (map type) or gantry in lieu
 100 m – cantilever sign
 Gore – "Exit" sign with junction number
 500 m following exit – route confirmation sign

At the entrance to Irish motorways, a "Motorway Ahead" sign is posted, listing the motorway regulations. The motorway speed limit is similarly posted on the slip-road.

These new signs were formally adopted with the publication of the 2010 Traffic Signs Manual.

Regulatory signs

Regulatory signs are mostly circular and mostly black on a white background, with a red border. If the sign contains a prohibition, a red line will diagonally bisect the sign. This type of road sign was introduced in 1956 with the Traffic Signs Regulations, 1956. Some signs were added later.

In the Republic of Ireland, the "Give Way" sign, a downward pointing triangle, reads "Yield" (on signs erected prior to 1997: "Yield Right of Way") or, in Gaeltacht areas along with most of county Waterford, "". A blank inverted triangle was provided for in legislation applicable between 1956 and 1961. The international octagonal "Stop" sign is also used.

Speed limit signs have the speed with the letters "km/h" underneath. 120 km/h is used for motorways and high quality dual carriageways e.g. N2, 100 km/h is used for national primary and national secondary roads and also many regional roads. 80 km/h is used for regional and local roads. 60, 50 and 30 km/h are used in urban built up areas (see Road speed limits in the Republic of Ireland). Due to the two speed limits possible on non-urban roads, there are no "end of speed limit" signs in Ireland (a white circle with black diagonal line as used in the UK) – the end of an urban speed restriction is signalled by the sign displaying the limit for the following section. 

Although differing from the design originally laid down (see Regulatory signs), "Keep Left" and "Keep Right" signs are now mostly white on a blue background, on the British pattern. In order to avail themselves of standard designs from British suppliers, local authorities had made extensive use of the white-on-blue design, mostly because the electronically lit type of white-on-blue was more practical, in consequence of which legislation was enacted making both patterns legal. Under the Irish Power of One (energy conservation campaign) the electronic signs are being gradually replaced by reflective signs. The former "No Entry" sign, a prohibition sign with an upward-pointing arrow, was replaced with the international standard red disk in TSM 2010. However the older version, now termed "No Straight Ahead", may be used when combined with a time or other restriction.

Signs shown in the table below are not relative size in all cases. Images are based on sizes presented in different ages of legislation. Actual signs may be found in varying sizes, with the 1994 regulations finally setting three definitive sets of metric dimensions for each sign. Larger signs are used on motorways, dual-carriageways, major junctions, etc.

Warning signs

Warning signs use the MUTCD design, in that they are black on an amber (orangish-yellow) background, and are diamond-shaped. This type of road sign was introduced in 1956 with the Traffic Signs Regulations, 1956. Some signs were added later, and many types of signs, even common ones, do not appear in any statutes. Some types of sign (for example, pedestrian/zebra crossing signs) are somewhat randomly designed, and differ between county/city boroughs.

The "low bridge" sign was the last road sign allowed to be erected in the Republic of Ireland with an imperial measurement, and was not replaced with a metric-only version until after publication of the 2010 TSM. Most current examples of this sign still bear dual imperial/metric measurements, and the imperial-only version remains in situ in a few locations.

Roadwork signs 
Road works hazard signs are reddish orange.

Obsolete signs

Earlier directional signs

The former 'fingerpost' style of Irish directional signs can still be seen in many rural areas of the Republic of Ireland. These signs differ from their modern-day equivalent as they have black raised text on a white background. Destinations are in all caps (the placename in Irish was on top and in a smaller font than the one in English). Sometimes, the former route number ("T" for trunk road, "L" for link road) can be seen, and the former Bord Fáilte logo can be seen on some (they had responsibility for signs for a time), as well as occasionally a harp. Distances on these signs are in miles.

This style of sign has become a common feature of many tourist images of Ireland and can be seen in some Irish pubs. However, they can be easily rotated, and have been done so on occasion and therefore are not completely reliable. While most examples of these signs still in situ are rural finger-posts, the advance directional sign of this era can still very occasionally be seen: this has a grey background, with the destinations in outlined, white-background boxes linked together with black lines, and the text is not raised on these, unlike on fingerposts. These signs, rare even when the system was in use, can be seen in some areas of Dún Laoghaire and Drogheda. These signs were prescribed under various regulations, with the final design prescribed under the Road Traffic Signs (Regulations) 1962.

Despite the new sign style being introduced in 1977, the design change was never legislated for (apart from a reference to the change to italics in 1989) and the old designs were repealed only under the 1997 regulations, 20 years later.

The first generation of the current sign system, introduced in 1977, can also be seen in on some national roads (and also on the oldest stretch of the M1). This is similar to the current system, but the signs are simpler, a different shade of green is used, and the Irish place names are not in italics. These signs were directly based on the Worboys Committee designs which had been adopted in the UK in 1965. These signs were replaced by the current system on 1 January 1989. The design of signs has continued to evolve with the introduction of patching under the Guildford Rules in 1994 and the introduction of cantilever directional signs in 2005, as well as the expansion in gantry signs since then.

The Republic of Ireland's 'Yield' sign formerly read 'Yield Right of Way', and many of this older variant can still be seen around the State.

Earlier warning signs
Before adoption of the 1956 traffic signs regulations, warning signs accorded to a standard laid out in the 1926 Road Signs and Traffic Signals Regulations. These signs, unlikely to exist in situ anywhere in the Republic of Ireland nowadays, were similar to signs used in the United Kingdom at that time.

The signs were cast-iron plates, with raised type painted black on yellow. A square pictogram illustrated the hazard, and the type of hazard was written in both Irish, with traditional typeface, and English. A hollow red triangle normally surmounted the pole to which the sign was attached.

Northern Ireland

Road signs in Northern Ireland conform in almost every respect to those used in the rest of the United Kingdom. Speed limits are signed in miles per hour and distances are displayed in imperial units.

Road signs in Great Britain are prescribed by the Traffic Signs Regulations and General Directions (the TSRGD). However, road signs in Northern Ireland are prescribed by The Traffic Signs Regulations (Northern Ireland) 1997, regulations which are currently administered by the Department for Infrastructure (the DfI), formerly known as the Department for Regional Development (the DRD).

See also

Roads in Ireland
Motorways in the Republic of Ireland
National primary road
National secondary road
Regional road
Local Roads in Ireland
Atlantic Corridor
Dublin Port Tunnel
Jack Lynch Tunnel
History of Roads in Ireland
Trunk Roads in Ireland
National Roads Authority
Road speed limits in the Republic of Ireland
Vehicle registration plates of Ireland
Northern Irish Vehicle Registration Plates
Transport in Ireland
List of Ireland-related topics

References

 Traffic Signs Manual 1996
 S.I. No. 181/1997: Road Traffic (Signs) Regulations, 1997
 S.I. No. 329/1979: Road Traffic (Signs) (Amendment) (No. 2) Regulations, 1979
 S.I. No. 256/1971: Road Traffic (Signs) (Amendment) (No. 3) Regulations, 1971
 S.I. No. 233/1966: Road Traffic (Signs) (Amendment) Regulations, 1966
 S.I. No. 56/1964: Road Traffic (Signs) (Amendment) Regulations, 1964
 S.I. No. 171/1962: Road Traffic (Signs) Regulations, 1962
 S.I. No. 67/1961: Traffic Signs (Amendment) Regulations, 1961
 S.I. No. 284/1956: Traffic Signs Regulations, 1956
 S.I. No. 55/1926: Road Signs and Traffic Signals Regulations, 1926

External links
 A copy of the "Transport" font is available here, free of charge.

Ireland
Signs
Transport in Ireland